Bombay Velvet is a 2015 Indian period gangster film directed and co-produced by Anurag Kashyap, based on historian Gyan Prakash's book Mumbai Fables. It stars Ranbir Kapoor, Anushka Sharma and Karan Johar in lead roles, with Kay Kay Menon, Manish Choudhary, Vivaan Shah and Siddhartha Basu appearing in supporting roles. The film was released on 15 May 2015.

The film, made on a budget of 120 crore, grossed around 23 crore in the first week. It opened to mixed reviews and was declared a commercial disaster upon failing miserably at the box office.

Plot
In 1969 Bombay, Balraj  is a street fighter/boxer who is in love with the jazz singer Rosie. Seeing Rosie with wealthy men further sparks his dream of becoming a "big-shot", believing that if he manages to become rich, he might win Rosie's heart. Balraj and his friend Chimman then catch the eye of Kaizad Khambatta, a wealthy businessman who is impressed by Balraj and offers him the chance to manage his club "Bombay Velvet", which Khambatta uses to further his illegal tasks and activities. He also nicknames Balraj "Johnny", which then becomes his identification. As well as this, Johnny and Chimman fulfill minor tasks for Khambatta, including capturing a dirty photograph of a minister who Khambatta wants to blackmail. This news reaches Jimmy Mistri, a media reporter, who also happens to be the same wealthy man Johnny had previously seen Rosie with.

Remembering that Johnny has a crush on Rosie, Mistri takes advantage of this and sends Rosie to Johnny's club to get her hands on the photograph of the minister. However, Rosie and Johnny eventually fall in love, and Mistri threatens to reveal Rosie's true identity to Johnny. Therefore, Rosie begins to supply information about Johnny & Khambatta's activities to Mistri. After a photograph of a secret meeting between Bombay's big-shots is leaked, Khambatta guesses that it was Rosie supplying the information and orders her to be killed. Johnny hears of this and forms an enmity with Khambatta, the man who brought him into the crime world.

Johnny fakes Rosie's death and makes her act as if she is her long dead twin sister Rita. But soon Khambatta realises the truth, kidnaps Rosie and tries to kill Johnny and they get into a standoff at Bombay Velvet. Khambatta shoots Rosie to provoke Johnny. Johnny angry at this stabs Khambatta and is himself shot dead while trying to carry Rosie to the hospital, outside the club. It is revealed before the end credits that Rosie survived her gunshot.

Cast

 Ranbir Kapoor as "Johnny" Balraj, a street fighter
 Anushka Sharma as Rosie Noronha, a jazz singer
 Karan Johar as Kaizad Khambatta, a quick-witted, flamboyant Parsi media mogul with a high-end attitude 
 Manish Choudhary as Jamshed "Jimmy" Mistry, a newspaper editor
 Satyadeep Mishra as Chimman, Balraj's friend
 Kay Kay Menon as Inspector Vishwas Kulkarni, a detective
 Siddhartha Basu as Romi Patel
 Remo Fernandes as a Portuguese man
 Vivaan Shah as Tony, Noronha's chauffeur
 Sarika Singh as Chimman's wife
 Shaanti as Hiral, Khambatta's wife
 Vicky Kaushal as Basil, Kulkarni's subordinate
 Mukesh Chhabra
 Varun Grover (Cameo) as a standup comedian
 Raveena Tandon (Cameo)
 Mrinmoy Goldar (Cameo)
 Christopher Hutton as himself (Cameo)
 Angelina Shum as herself (cameo)

Production

Development
Kashyap was inspired to make such a film after reading L.A. Quartet, a sequence of four crime fiction novels by James Ellroy, set in the late 1940s through the late 1950s in Los Angeles. The novels inspired him to "dig into the dark trenches of the history of Bombay", where he "found a treasure trove that was never-ending".

Bombay Velvet was initially to be produced by Viacom18, but Fox STAR Studios decided to co-produce it with Phantom Films. It is based on Gyan Prakash's book Mumbai Fables and set in early 1950s towards 1970s, before Mumbai became a metropolis. Prakash is also one of the scriptwriters for the film.

Casting
Although Hrithik Roshan, Aamir Khan, Ranveer Singh and Saif Ali Khan were considered, Ranbir Kapoor was cast as a street fighter, and Anushka Sharma was cast as a jazz singer. Kapoor explained his casting, "The script of Bombay Velvet just fell into my lap. I read it and I knew immediately that I wanted to be part of Anurag's grand vision, his innovative storytelling, his movie-making process; everything that he does so perfectly." This was director Karan Johar's second film after Dilwale Dulhania Le Jayenge (1995); he was cast as the film's primary antagonist, Kaizad Khambata. His role is said to have been inspired from Russi Karanjia.

Filming
Principal photography began in mid-July 2013 and continued till early September 2013. The first schedule was shot at Sri Lanka's Ranmihitenna Mahinda Rajapaksa National Tele Cinema Park, Hambantota. Filming was also done in Colombo, Galle, and Pasikudah. The second schedule was also in Mahinda Rajapaksa National Tele Cinema Park, Sri Lanka, where Sharma and Kapoor rejoined the filming in February. The second schedule completed in March. Parts of the set was left at the National Tele Cinema Park, rather than being dismantled, as it will be used as a tourist attraction site. The third and final schedule was in Mumbai where shooting was held for a ten-day period.

Editing
The film was released in only one version and was edited in collaboration by Prerna Saigal (The Lunchbox (2013)) and Academy Award-winning editor Thelma Schoonmaker.

Themes
Bombay Velvet is influenced by Classic Hollywood cinema including Film Noir with its stereotypical caricatures like gangsters, gun molls and femme fatales. The movie draws inspiration from gangster films of the '30s and the '40s like The Roaring Twenties (1939) and White Heat (1949) and neo-noir films like Chinatown (1974) and L.A. Confidential (1997).

Marketing
A teaser of the film's first-look was released on 28 January 2015, it featured Ranbir Kapoor's avatar in the film "Johnny Balraj", the "big shot". On 29 January 2015, the official first poster was revealed, featuring Johnny Balraj wearing a pinstriped suit and wielding a Thompson submachine gun in each arm. An official trailer was released during the India vs Bangladesh 2015 Cricket World Cup quarter final match, with Kapoor present at the Star Sports 3 studio with the commentators. The film also attracted brand associations worth Rs. 20 Crore with brands like Reliance Jio Chat, Saavn, Gillete, GoDaddy among others. To build hype and buzz around the film, Fox Star India and Phantom Films crowdsourced the official fan art for the movie by running a poster design contest on Cupick.

Soundtrack

The soundtrack for Bombay Velvet is composed by Amit Trivedi, which he began working on the soundtrack after the release of Dev D. Amit stated in an interview that, "The music of Bombay Velvet will reflect the age of 1960s Jazz era of Bollywood." The lyrics were written by Amitabh Bhattacharya. The album was released on 24 April 2015 by Zee Music Company, which took care of the film's audio rights.

The song "Fifi" is a remake of the Hindi song "Jaata Kahaan Hai Deewane" from the 1956 film C.I.D. which was originally composed by O. P. Nayyar and written by Majrooh Sultanpuri. It was re-created by Mickey McCleary.

Devesh Sharma writing for Filmfare stated that, "The album won’t appeal to you on first listening. Give it time to grow on you and then you’ll appreciate what Amit Trivedi and his singers and musicians have achieved. But in this era of instant gratification, does one have that patience? Also, the album is true to the narrative. There are no stand-alone songs in it. That also goes against making it a popular choice. One can only say that let the music play – and you sure will be rewarded with a rich listening experience." Koimoi rated the album 3 out of 5 stars, with penning the final word: "The Bombay Velvet album is true to its theme – a complete vintage treat. Amit Trivedi does a damn good job at re-creating the 50s era and the Jazz is truly a masterpiece."

Joginder Tuteja of Bollywood Hungama rated the album 2.5 out of 5 stars stating "The music of Bombay Velvet is pretty much on the expected lines, which means it doesn't really follow Bollywood norms and instead treads a path of its own. While this doesn't necessarily mean that there is a plethora of chartbusters in the offering, the songs seem good enough to fit into the storytelling of the film." BollywoodLife gave 2/5 rating with a statement "To sum up, the album is a mixed bag. Some songs are really good while some are really not that great. When Amit Trivedi is there as the composer you really expect all the songs to be fab. Maybe, commercially this album might not work, but some tracks will definitely be one of the best period tracks for years to come. To be honest, even after being a period drama, the music seems more jazzy than giving you that nostalgic feel. Maybe all the songs would make more sense once you see it with the movie. As a separate album, this is just a bit thanda!"

The album was ranked #91 on Top 100 Bollywood Albums, listed by Film Companion. It was listed as the Best Bollywood Album of 2015 by Deccan Music.

Release
The film released on 15 May 2015 in 2600 screens worldwide.

Critical reception
Performances of Kapoor, Sharma and Johar received positive reviews, but the incoherent script and direction were heavily criticized. Arunava Chatterjee of Indiatoday rated it 3.5 stars and said, "While vintage seems to be the new fad in Bollywood, Bombay Velvet deserves a standing ovation in this age of run-of-the-mill Friday releases." Bollywood Hungama also gave it 3.5 stars and said, "On the whole, Bombay Velvet is a visual masterpiece that is rich in form. If you want to be wowed by the detailing of the 1960s, superb performances of Kapoor, Sharma and Johar, then go ahead and watch this film." Shubha Saha of Mid-Day gave Bombay Velvet 3.5 stars and said, "Bombay Velvet is more like a roller coaster ride, as it takes you on a dizzy high with its charming ambience and music that is bound to stay with you for long, but later you are brought down not so gently with the underwhelming plot and lack of punches. Watch it for the experience."

Box office
The film opened to dull occupancy ranging 10%–20% on first day and on the second day half of the theatres removed it. On the third day it disappeared from all cinemas as the halls were empty. The film collected  on first day

Awards and nominations

References

External links
 
 
 

2015 films
2015 crime drama films
2015 crime thriller films
Indian crime drama films
Indian crime thriller films
2010s Hindi-language films
Films about organised crime in India
Films based on crime novels
Films based on Indian novels
Films based on thriller novels
Films set in India
Films set in the 1960s
Films shot in Mumbai
Films shot in Sri Lanka
Jazz films
Films set in Mumbai
Films scored by Amit Trivedi
Fox Star Studios films